Perdita koebelei is a species of bee in the family Andrenidae. It is found in North America.

Subspecies
These two subspecies belong to the species Perdita koebelei:
 Perdita koebelei concinna Timberlake
 Perdita koebelei koebelei Timberlake

References

Further reading

 
 

Andrenidae
Articles created by Qbugbot
Insects described in 1964